Marcia Stephens Bloom Bernicat (born 1953) is an American diplomat who is the current Director General of the Foreign Service. She is a former United States Ambassador to Bangladesh. She served as Ambassador to Senegal and Guinea-Bissau from 2008 to 2011. From January 1, 2019, to April 3, 2020, she was Principal Deputy Assistant Secretary in the Bureau of Oceans and International Environmental and Scientific Affairs at the Department of State.

Early life and education
Bernicat was born in 1953. She grew up in Tinton Falls, New Jersey and graduated from Monmouth Regional High School. In 1975 she earned a B.A. from Lafayette College, where she majored in history. Through work with her mentor and thesis advisor, she became particularly interested in the League of Nations and the relationship between the United States and the United Nations. She earned an M.S. in Foreign Service from Georgetown University in 1980.

Career
Bernicat began her career working in a managerial position at Procter & Gamble in Staten Island, New York.

In 1982, Bernicat began her career as a Foreign Service Officer at the U.S. embassy in Bamako, the capital of Mali. She served as consular officer at the U.S. consulate general in Marseille, France from 1984 to 1986. From 1986 to 1989 she held position in the U.S., but successive moves after that had her assigned in India, Morocco, Malawi and Barbados. From 2006 to 2008 she was office director for several Asian countries. In that role she was engaged in negotiations to supply India with non-military nuclear materials. She was nominated by George W. Bush in 2008 to be U.S. Ambassador to Senegal and Guinea-Bissau.

From 2012 to 2014 Bernicat served as Deputy Assistant Secretary in the Bureau of Human Resources at the Department of State. In 2014 she was nominated and confirmed as U.S. Ambassador to Bangladesh. She spoke with the Senate Foreign Relations Committee about Bangladesh, noting that it is the eighth largest country in the world by population and third largest Muslim majority nation. Bangladesh, she observed, is known for traditions that are moderate and pluralistic.

Biden administration
On April 15, 2021, President Joe Biden announced his intent to nominate Bernicat to serve as the Director General of the Foreign Service. On April 28, 2021, her nomination was sent to the Senate. On September 15, 2021, a hearing on her nomination was held before the Senate Foreign Relations Committee. On October 19, 2021, her nomination was reported favorably out of committee. On May 26, 2022, the United States Senate confirmed her nomination by a 82-10 vote. She began service on May 31, 2022, and was sworn in by Deputy Secretary Brian P. McKeon on June 6, 2022.

Personal
Bernicat speaks French, Hindi and Russian.  She is married to Olivier Bernicat and they have two children.

See also

List of ambassadors of the United States

References

1957 births
Living people
21st-century American diplomats
African-American diplomats
Ambassadors of the United States to Bangladesh
Ambassadors of the United States to Guinea-Bissau
Ambassadors of the United States to Senegal
American women ambassadors
Directors General of the United States Foreign Service
Lafayette College alumni
Monmouth Regional High School alumni
People from Tinton Falls, New Jersey
Obama administration personnel
United States Foreign Service personnel
Walsh School of Foreign Service alumni
American diplomats
American women diplomats
Biden administration personnel